The 1920–21 Army Cadets men's ice hockey season was the 18th season of play for the program. The team was coached by Talbot Hunter in his 1st season.

Season
There were high hopes for the team when it brought in Talbot Hunter. This was the first time that the team had used someone who was a professional coach and Hunter had years of experience at the college level. Unfortunately, warm weather wrecked the Cadet's season. The team was not even assembled until after the new year but 30 men showed up despite the difficulties. Owing to the poor ice, only four games were scheduled, but even then, the first against Pennsylvania had to be cancelled. The first match ended up being with YMCA College in early February. The teams fought to a 1–1 draw after two halves and then exploded offensively in overtime. Both sides netted 2 goals and finished with a tie.

Army lost their starting center, Woods, to a broken ankle and O'Shea was put in his place for the final two games. He played well in relief and helped the Cadets perform well in two losses. Despite the record, Army showed improvement under Hunter and the belief was all that was needed for the team to take the next step was suitable weather.

Roster

Standings

Schedule and results

|-
!colspan=12 style=";" | Regular Season

References

Army Black Knights men's ice hockey seasons
Army
Army
Army
Army